The Bob Lucas Stadium (formerly named the Wessex Stadium) is a football stadium in Weymouth, England. It has been the home ground of Weymouth F.C. since 1987. It was formerly a greyhound racing and speedway stadium.

Football
The ground, which was built to hold 10,000 with 900 seated in the stand, first saw a football kicked with the visit of Taunton Town in the Western Counties Floodlight Cup final on 18 August 1987 in front of 1,023 spectators. The league season opened on 26 August with a visit from Lincoln City – who had just suffered relegation from the Football League – and the official attendance was 3,500.

Ron Greenwood performed the official opening of the ground on 21 October 1987, prior to an exhibition match against Manchester United - which the Terras won 1–0. The attendance for this fixture was given as 4,904.

In July 2010, the name of the stadium was changed from the Wessex Stadium in homage to the long-serving club president Bob Lucas, during his fight against cancer. He died a month later, aged 85.

Origins
The Wessex Stadium was built on the west side of the East Chickerell Court Lane opposite the East Chickerell Race Course in the early 1950s.

Greyhound racing
Greyhound racing first took place at the stadium on 5 August 1954. The racing was independent (not affiliated to the sports governing body the National Greyhound Racing Club). Racing was held on Thursday and Saturday evenings.

The track was described as a fast galloping grass track with an inside Sumner hare system and race distances of 300, 525, 765 and 990 yards. The racing ended in 1985.

Speedway
Speedway took place between 1954 and 1985.

References

External links
Ground of the week: The Wessex Stadium (BBC)
Stadium images

Football venues in England
Bob Lucas
Multi-purpose stadiums in the United Kingdom
Sports venues in Dorset
Sports venues completed in 1987
Defunct greyhound racing venues in the United Kingdom
Defunct speedway venues in England
1987 establishments in England